Walkeshwar Temple, also known as the Baan Ganga Temple, is a temple dedicated to the Hindu god, Shiva located in Walkeshwar, near Malabar Hill neighbourhood, in South Mumbai precinct of the city of Mumbai, India. It is situated at the highest point of the city, and close to the temple lies the Banganga Tank.

Legend
Legend has it that Hindu god, Rama paused at that spot on his way from Ayodhya to Lanka in pursuit of the demon king, Ravana who had kidnapped his wife, Sita. Then Lord Rama was advised to worship Shiva lingam and he is said to have constructed the original linga of sand, after getting tired of waiting for his brother, Lakshman to bring an idol. The name is etymologically derived from the Sanskrit word for an idol made of sand -- Valuka Iswar, an Avatar of Shiva.

As the story progresses, when Rama was thirsty, as there was no fresh water readily available (only sea water), he shot an arrow and brought Ganges over here. Hence Bana (arrow in Sanskrit) Ganges.  The water that feeds the tank stems from an underground spring at that spot, despite its proximity to the sea.

History
The temple and the attached fresh water Banganga Tank were built in 1127 AD by Lakshman Prabhu, a Chandraseniya Kayastha Prabhu minister in the court of Silhara dynasty Kings who ruled Thane, and the islands of Mumbai during 810 to 1240 AD.  The temple was destroyed by the Portuguese during their reign over Mumbai in the 16th century.  It was rebuilt due to the generosity of Mumbai businessman and philanthropist, Rama Kamat, a Gaud Saraswat Brahmin (known in British records as 'Kamati') in 1715. The main temple has been substantially reconstructed and many smaller temples have come up around the Banganga Tank. By 1860, the temple started attracting greater crowds and 10 to 20 other temples had come up around it and 50 dharamshalas.

Even today the temple itself and much of the property in the complex belongs to the Gaud Saraswat Brahmin Temple Trust.

The temple has inscriptions with 8 verses in Sanskrit, which describe the story of the temple. The inscription is given below;

अत्र शिलाहारन्वय समये द्वादशमिते शते क्रैस्ते |

शिवमन्दिरं पुराणं रेजे यल्लक्ष्मणेश्वराख्यमभ्रुत् ||1||

रचितं लक्ष्मणनाम्ना गोमन्तद्विजमहाप्रधानेन |

ऐतिह्ये वार्तेयं लोकें सौमित्रिणा तु संबद्धा ||2||

काले मुम्बाद्वीपे क्रूरफिरङ्गीतरङ्गभङ्गहते |

विध्वन्सितं तदैतत केवलमासीत शिलासमाहारः ||3||

मुम्बाद्वीपे पश्चात् आङ्ग् वणि क्य संघशासनं प्राप्ते |

आसीन्मुद्राध्यक्ष सेनाध्यक्षस्तथा महाश्रेष्ठी ||4||

सुमतिर्जनाभिराम पुण्यात्मा रामकामतिनाम |

सारस्वतं कुलं यो गार्ग्यं गोत्रं च भूषयामास ||5||

संस्थाप्यादौ 'कोटे' सामळियालाल-वेङ्कटेशौ सः |

नन्दशरर्षिधरित्री -मिते तदूर्ध्वं स विक्रमे वर्षे ||6||

जीर्णोद्धारं कृत्वा पुनरपि शिवमन्दिरं स निर्मितवान् |

चद्वालुकेश्वर इति ख्यातिं लोकेषु पावनीमाप ||7||

क्षुद्रो वालुककण इव विश्व कृत्सन यदग्रतो भाति |

तं वालुकेश्वरमहं वन्दे अनन्तं कृपनिधिं शान्तम ||8||

Worship
The temple is generally busy every month only during the full moon, and at Amavasya (new moon). In the past, it was a favorite of the Malabar pirates who used to frequent the islands during the 16th and 17th centuries.

It is currently the site of an annual Hindustani classical music festival, which in 2005 featured musicians like classical singers Rajan and Sajan Mishra, and Santoor maestro Shivkumar Sharma. Branches of Shri Kavle Math and Shri Kashi Math, famous religious seats of Gaud Saraswat Brahmins, are located on the northern and western banks of the tank, respectively.

Gallery

References

 Mallya, K.G. The Merchant Of Bombay, Mumbai:Bharatiya Vidya Bhavan (1997).  —An historical novel of the life of Rama Kamati.

External links

 Temples Of Saraswat Brahmins
 Walkeshwar Banganga Tank and Temple

Hindu temples in Mumbai
Shiva temples in Maharashtra